Hoseynabad-e Khani (also Romanized as Ḩoseynābād-e Khānī; also known as Ḩoseynābād) is a village in Dehsard Rural District, in the Central District of Arzuiyeh County, Kerman Province, Iran. At the 2006 census, its population was 112, in 28 families.

References 

Populated places in Arzuiyeh County